Ismail bin Othman is a Malaysian politician and has served as Malacca State Executive Councillor.

Election results

Honours

Honours of Malaysia
  :
  Companion Class I of the Order of Malacca (DMSM) – Datuk (2010)
  Knight Commander of the Order of Malacca (DCSM) - Datuk Wira (2017)

References

Living people
United Malays National Organisation politicians
Malaysian people of Malay descent
Malaysian Muslims
Members of the Malacca State Legislative Assembly
Malacca state executive councillors
21st-century Malaysian politicians
Year of birth missing (living people)